John G. Sweeney (May 13, 1924 - December 13, 2016) was a member of the Ohio House of Representatives.

References

1924 births
Democratic Party members of the Ohio House of Representatives
2016 deaths